Picky Talarico is a film director and photographer who has directed music videos for artists like Juanes, Julieta Venegas, Paulina Rubio, Diego Torres, Julio Iglesias, Gustavo Cerati, Kevin Johansen, and Bajofondo.

He has been nominated for two Latin Grammy Awards and five MTV Video Music Awards among other multiple awards around the globe.

Film directions

Music videos
Acerca De Este Invierno Que Viene – Ulises Butrón (1992)
Nacar Y Amor – La Guardia Del Fuego (1993)
Desde Que Te Vi – La Guardia Del Fuego (1993)
Por Piedad – La Guardia Del Fuego (1994)
Costanera Blues – La Guardia Del Fuego (1994)
Perro Malo – La Guardia Del Fuego (1994)
La Medianera – Viuda E Hijas De Roque Enroll (1994)
Polaco – Ulises Butrón (1996)
Sé Que Ya No Volverás – Diego Torres (1996)
Nada Es Para Siempre – Fabiana Cantilo (1996)
Tarjeta Postal – Turf (1997)
Casanova – Turf (1998)
Días Blancos de Primavera – Pedro Aznar (1998)
Neuronas – Andy Chango (1998)
Viene Llegando – Turf (1998)
Cable Pelado – El Peyote Asesino (1999)
Rosita – Árbol (1999)
Se Viene Bersuit Vergarabat (1999)
Chilenada – Dracma (2000)
En Esta Habitación – Líbido (2000)
Meditación #9 – Sebastián Escofet (2000)
Propiedad Privada – Soledad Pastorutti (2000)
El Sistema – Pression (2000)
Sueles Dejarme Solo – Cabezones (2000)
Paseo Inmoral – Gustavo Cerati (2000)
Demasiado – Daniela Herrero (2001)
Despegar – Cabezones (2001)
Luna Cautiva – Soledad Pastorutti (2001)
Positiva – Érica García (2001)
Sólo Tus canciones – Daniela Herrero (2001)
La Vida – Árbol (2001)
El Viejo – La Vela Puerca (2001)
Mi semilla – La Vela Puerca (2002)
Corazón de Papel – Julio Iglesias (2003)
Encanto – Sandy & Junior (2003)
Mala Gente – Juanes (2003)
Fotografía – Juanes feat. Nelly Furtado (2003)
Desnúdate Mujer – David Bisbal (2004)
Desperdiçou – Sandy & Junior (2004)
Hoy – Zayra (2004)
Magia – Sin Bandera (2004)
La Procesión – Kevin Johansen (2004)
Desde Que – Liquits (2005)
Resucitar – Gian Marco (2004)
Tu Corazón lo Sabe – Kalimba (2004)
Desde Que te Perdí – Kevin Johansen (2005)
Nada Vai Me Sufocar – Sandy & Junior (2005)
No Te Preocupes por Mí – Chayanne (2005)
Mía – Paulina Rubio (2005)
Hace Tiempo – Fonseca (2005)
Me Voy – Julieta Venegas (2006)
 Para Tu Amor – Juanes (2006)
Limón y Sal – Julieta Venegas (2006)
Replay – Sandy & Junior (2006)
Pa' Bailar – Bajofondo (2007)
Perdóname en Silencio – Reyli (2007)
Inventario – Valeria Gastaldi (2007)
Día Azul – Jimena Angel (2007)
Descarada – Verónica Orozco (2007)
Casandra – Ismael Serrano (2007)
Yo Me Voy – Ilona (2007)
Una, 2 y 3 – Antonio Carmona (2008)
El Mareo – Bajofondo (2008)
 Gotas de Agua Dulce – Juanes (2008)
 a Marte – El General Paz & La Triple Frontera (2008)
El Andén - Bajofondo (2009) 
En tus Tierras Bailaré (2010)
Desde Que No Estás – Fonseca (2011)
Lluvia – Bajofondo (2013)

References

External links
Official website.

Music video directors
Living people
People of Calabrian descent
Year of birth missing (living people)